Rezin A. De Bolt (January 20, 1828 – October 30, 1891) was a U.S. Representative from Missouri.

Born near Basil, Ohio, De Bolt attended the common schools.
He was employed as a tanner.
He studied law.
He was admitted to the bar in 1856 and commenced practice in Lancaster, Ohio.
He moved to Trenton, Missouri, in 1858 and continued the practice of his profession.
He was appointed in 1859 and elected in 1860 commissioner of common schools for Grundy County.
He entered the Union Army as captain in the Twenty-third Regiment, Missouri Volunteers, in 1861.
Captured at the Battle of Shiloh, April 6, 1862, and held as prisoner until the following October.
He resigned his commission in 1863 because of impaired health.

De Bolt was elected judge of the circuit court for the eleventh judicial circuit of Missouri in November 1863, which position he held by reelection until January 1, 1875.
In 1864 again entered the United States service as major in the Forty-fourth Regiment, Missouri Volunteer Infantry.
Mustered out in August 1865.

De Bolt was elected as a Democrat to the Forty-fourth Congress (March 4, 1875 – March 3, 1877).
He was not a candidate for renomination in 1876.
He resumed the practice of law.
He died in Trenton, Missouri, October 30, 1891.
He was interred in Odd Fellows Cemetery.

References

External links 
 

1828 births
1891 deaths
Union Army officers
Missouri state court judges
Democratic Party members of the United States House of Representatives from Missouri
19th-century American politicians
People from Baltimore, Ohio
People from Trenton, Missouri
19th-century American judges